My Father's Daughter is a personal memoir by Sheila Fitzpatrick published in 2010 by the Melbourne University Press. In 2011, it won the Prime Minister's Literary Award for non-fiction and the Queensland Literary Award for non-fiction.

References 

2007 Australian novels